Geissomeria schottiana is a plant native to the Cerrado vegetation of Brazil. This plant is cited in Flora Brasiliensis by Carl Friedrich Philipp von Martius.

External links
 Flora Brasiliensis: Geissomeria schottiana

schottiana
Flora of Brazil
Flora of the Cerrado